The Rowe Street Baptist Church was built in 1846 in Boston, Massachusetts. It was the third Baptist church built in the city.

History 
On April 27. 1846, the cornerstone for the church was laid . It was built of dark-red sandstone in the Gothic style, with a corner tower and a 175-foot spire. The interior of the building was finished in black walnut. On April 7, 1847, the building was dedicated. The church adopted the name the "Rowe Street Baptist Society".

The intended pastor for the church was Mr. Hague, but his ill health had prevented him from leading the church. On November 1, 1848 Rev. Baron Stow, previously with the Baldwin Place (second Baptist) Church in the North End, was called as the church pastor. In 1853 there were 275 members and more than 400 Sunday school students.

Notes

References

Further reading 
 A Brief History of the Rowe Street Baptist Church, Boston: With the Declaration of Faith, the Church Covenant, and List of Members. Rowe Street Baptist Church. Boston: Gould and Lincoln, 1858.
 John Calvin Stockbridge (1871). The Model Pastor: A memoir of the life and correspondence of Rev. Baron Stow, D. D., late pastor of the Rowe street Baptist church, Boston. Lee and Shepard.

Baptist churches in Boston
Former churches in Massachusetts
African-American history in Boston
Churches completed in 1847